Scott Piercy (born November 6, 1978) is an American professional golfer who plays on the PGA Tour.

Early life
Born and raised in Las Vegas, Nevada, Piercy played college golf at San Diego State and turned professional after graduation in 2001.

Career
Piercy started by playing on various mini-tours.  In 2007, Piercy won the Ultimate Game at Wynn Las Vegas G&CC, earning $2 million. Piercy became a Nationwide Tour member in 2008. He won two tournaments in August and finished ninth on the money list to earn PGA Tour playing rights for 2009.

Piercy made an encouraging start to his PGA Tour career, recording five top-twenty finishes in his first six starts, and this run of form elevated Piercy into the top 100 of the Official World Golf Rankings in March 2009. He finished the season ranked 90th on the money list to retain his tour card, but slipped to 136th in 2010, and lost some of his tour status for 2011.

In 2011, Piercy won his first PGA Tour event at the Reno-Tahoe Open, an alternate event in early August. His second tour win  came in July 2012 at the RBC Canadian Open, one stroke over runners-up Robert Garrigus and William McGirt. As a result, Piercy earned a place in the following week's WGC-Bridgestone Invitational and was therefore unable to defend his Reno-Tahoe Open title. In early November, he was a runner-up at the WGC-HSBC Champions in China. The Canadian Open win gained Piercy entry into the Masters in 2013, his first, and made the cut. During the 2013 season, he finished third at the Waste Management Phoenix Open, tied for fifth at the PGA Championship and Byron Nelson Championship, and reached the round of 16 at the WGC-Accenture Match Play Championship.

In the 2014 season, Piercy had an arm injury and was out for five months. In his return, he had a best result of T-12 at the Wyndham Championship.

In the 2015 season, he finished seventh at the Shriners Hospitals for Children Open, runner-up at the Sony Open in Hawaii, tenth at the Shell Houston Open. In July, he won the inaugural Barbasol Championship in Alabama, an alternate event opposite the Open Championship, for his first victory in three years. At the 2016 U.S. Open At Oakmont, Piercy finished at a tie for second, his best major finish to date. Piercy was unable to defend his title in 2016 because he earned entry into the 2016 Open Championship.

Piercy set a tournament score record through the first 54 holes at the 2022 3M Open at TPC Twin Cities in Blaine, Minnesota; however, he shot a 76 on the final round and Tony Finau took home the trophy.

Controversy
In March 2020, Piercy shared a meme on his Instagram page of Pepe the Frog and Pete Buttigieg which stated "Peter pulls out early from behind." The post was considered homophobic by Queerty and ESPN, which both reported Piercy is losing multiple sponsorships, including Titleist, FootJoy, and J.Lindeberg, totaling over $2 million in lost sponsorships. Additionally, the PGA Tour stated "We were made aware of Scott's post and are disappointed in the lack of judgment used."

Professional wins (6)

PGA Tour wins (4)

Nationwide Tour wins (2)

Results in major championships
Results not in chronological order in 2020.

CUT = missed the halfway cut
"T" indicates a tie for a place.
NT = No tournament due to COVID-19 pandemic

Summary

Most consecutive cuts made – 3 (2015 PGA − 2016 U.S. Open)
Longest streak of top-10s – 1 (twice)

Results in The Players Championship

CUT = missed the halfway cut
"T" indicates a tie for a place
C = Cancelled after the first round due to the COVID-19 pandemic

Results in World Golf Championships
Results not in chronological order before 2015.

QF, R16, R32, R64 = Round in which player lost in match play
"T" = Tied

See also
2008 Nationwide Tour graduates

References

External links

American male golfers
San Diego State Aztecs men's golfers
PGA Tour golfers
Korn Ferry Tour graduates
Golfers from Nevada
Sportspeople from Las Vegas
1978 births
Living people